The 2017 Fiesta Bowl was a college football bowl game played on December 30, 2017, at University of Phoenix Stadium in Glendale, Arizona. The 47th Fiesta Bowl was one of the 2017–18 bowl games concluding the 2017 FBS football season.

The game was televised on ESPN and ESPN Deportes, and broadcast on ESPN Radio and XM Satellite Radio, with the kickoff set for 4:00 PM ET (2 PM MT). The game's title sponsor was Sony Interactive Entertainment via its PlayStation brand as part of a multi-year deal with broadcasting and marketing rightsholder ESPN, which includes branded content and making PlayStation the official video gaming and virtual reality sponsor of the College Football Playoff; the game is officially known as the PlayStation Fiesta Bowl.

Teams
The two participants for the game were the Penn State Nittany Lions of the Big Ten Conference and the Washington Huskies of the Pac-12 Conference.

This was only the third time that Penn State and Washington played each other, and the Nittany Lions had won both previous meetings. The most recent game was 34 years earlier in Honolulu at the 1983 Aloha Bowl, where Penn State defeated the Huskies   The first meeting was in 1921, where Penn State defeated the Washington Sun Dodgers  on December 3 

The Nittany Lions had appeared in six previous Fiesta Bowls: 1977, 1980, 1982, 1987, 1992, and 1997, winning all six.  This was the Huskies' first Fiesta Bowl appearance.

Penn State

The Nittany Lions entered the game with a 10–2 record, with their two losses coming in conference play in consecutive weeks by a combined four points at #6 Ohio State and at #24 Michigan State.

Washington

Line
Penn State was favored by 3 points when the game kicked off.

Game summary

Scoring summary

Statistics

References

2017–18 NCAA football bowl games
2017
2017
2017
2017 in sports in Arizona
Fiesta Bowl